In mathematics a regular Hadamard matrix is a Hadamard matrix whose row and column sums are all equal.  While the order of a Hadamard matrix must be 1, 2, or a multiple of 4, regular Hadamard matrices carry the further restriction that the order be a square number.  The excess, denoted E(H), of a Hadamard matrix H of order n is defined to be the sum of the entries of H.  The excess satisfies the bound
|E(H)| ≤ n3/2.  A Hadamard matrix attains this bound if and only if it is regular.

Parameters
If n = 4u2 is the order of a regular Hadamard matrix, then the excess is ±8u3 and the row and column sums all equal ±2u.  It follows that each row has 2u2 ± u positive entries and 2u2 ∓ u negative entries.  The orthogonality of rows implies that any two distinct rows have exactly u2 ± u positive entries in common.  If H is interpreted as the incidence matrix of a block design, with 1 representing incidence and −1 representing non-incidence, then H corresponds to a symmetric 2-(v,k,λ) design with parameters (4u2, 2u2 ± u, u2 ± u).  A design with these parameters is called a Menon design.

Construction

A number of methods for constructing regular Hadamard matrices are known, and some exhaustive computer searches have been done for regular Hadamard matrices with specified symmetry groups, but it is not known whether every even perfect square is the order of a regular Hadamard matrix.  Bush-type Hadamard matrices are regular Hadamard matrices of a special form, and are connected with finite projective planes.

History and naming
Like Hadamard matrices more generally, regular Hadamard matrices are named after Jacques Hadamard. Menon designs are named after P Kesava Menon, and Bush-type Hadamard matrices are named after Kenneth A. Bush.

References
 C.J. Colbourn and J.H. Dinitz (Eds.), The CRC Handbook of Combinatorial Designs, 2nd ed., CRC Press, Boca Raton, Florida., 2006.
 W. D. Wallis, Anne Penfold Street, and Jennifer Seberry Wallis, Combinatorics: Room Squares, Sum-Free Sets, Hadamard Matrices, Springer-Verlag, Berlin 1972.

Matrices